Jamie Buhrer (born 28 November 1989) is an Australian former professional rugby league footballer who played as a  and  for the Manly Warringah Sea Eagles and the Newcastle Knights in the NRL. He also played for NSW City and New South Wales.

Background
Buhrer was born in Westmead, New South Wales, Australia. He was educated at Patrician Brothers' College, Blacktown in New South Wales. 

He played his junior rugby league for the Hills District Bulls. He was then signed by the Manly Warringah Sea Eagles.

Playing career

Early career
In 2008 and 2009, Buhrer played 47 games for the Manly Warringah Sea Eagles' NYC team, scoring 15 tries in total.

2010
In 2010, Buhrer graduated to the Sea Eagles' Queensland Cup team, Sunshine Coast Sea Eagles. In round 10 of the 2010 NRL season, he made his NRL debut for the Sea Eagles against the Parramatta Eels.

2011
He played off the interchange bench in the Sea Eagles' 2011 NRL Grand Final win over the New Zealand Warriors. Later on that month, he re-signed with the Sea Eagles on a 3-year contract until the end of 2014.

2012
In April, he played for New South Wales City against New South Wales Country in the annual City vs Country Origin match. A month later, he gained selection for the New South Wales State of Origin team to take on Queensland in game one of the series in Melbourne on 23 May 2012. He was subsequently dropped from the side.

2014
In May, Buhrer returned to the New South Wales City side. In September, he tore his anterior cruciate ligament, ruling him out for the rest of the season. Later on that month, he re-signed with the Sea Eagles on a 3-year contract until the end of 2017.

2016
In October, after playing 128 games for the Sea Eagles, Buhrer was released from the final year of his contract to sign a 2-year contract with the Newcastle Knights starting in 2017.

2017
Upon joining the Knights, Buhrer formed part of the leadership group of the playing roster. He made his debut for the Knights in round 1 of the 2017 season against the New Zealand Warriors. During a training session in April, he suffered a fractured foot and was expected to miss up to eight weeks. He finished the year with 16 matches and 1 try for the Knights.

2018
In 2018, Buhrer played in 20 matches for the Knights, mostly from the interchange bench.

2019
Due to increasing depth in the Knights' squad, Buhrer only played 9 NRL matches in 2019, before departing at season's end. In November, he announced his retirement from rugby league.

References

External links

Newcastle Knights profile
NRL profile

 

1989 births
Australian rugby league players
New South Wales City Origin rugby league team players
New South Wales Rugby League State of Origin players
Manly Warringah Sea Eagles players
Newcastle Knights players
Newcastle Knights captains
Sunshine Coast Sea Eagles players
Rugby league second-rows
Rugby league locks
Rugby league hookers
Living people